Arvid Johansen (12 November 1910  –  1 May 1996) was a Norwegian politician for the Labour Party.

He was born in Sør-Odal.

He was elected to the Norwegian Parliament from Hedmark in 1945, but was not re-elected in 1949.

Johansen was a member of the executive committee of Sør-Odal municipality council from 1937 to 1945, and later served as deputy mayor during the terms 1959–1963 and 1963–1967.

References

1910 births
1996 deaths
Labour Party (Norway) politicians
Members of the Storting
20th-century Norwegian politicians
People from Sør-Odal